River Finn or Finn River may refer to two rivers in Ireland:

River Finn (Foyle tributary) — mainly flows through County Donegal, into the River Foyle
Finn River (County Fermanagh and County Monaghan) — a small river that flows into Upper Lough Erne